Rafael Antonio Tolosa Calvo (born 28 August 1958) is a Colombian racing cyclist. He rode in the 1983 Tour de France.

References

1958 births
Living people
Colombian male cyclists
Place of birth missing (living people)